The Belle Mahone Stakes is a Canadian Thoroughbred horse race run annually at Woodbine Racetrack in Toronto, Ontario. Run in August, the ungraded event is open to fillies and mares, age three and older. Raced over a distance of  miles on Polytrack synthetic dirt, it currently offers a purse of $75,750.

The Belle Mahone Stakes was first run in 1956 but was ended after the 1997 edition. Revived in 2002, there was no race held in 2005.

Records
Most wins:
 3 - Ice Water (1966, 1967, 1968)

Winners

Earlier winners

2001 - no race
2000 - no race
1999 - no race
1998 - no race
1997 - Mips
1996 - Ennisbeg
1995 - Holly Regent
1994 - Pennyhill Park
1993 - Dance For Donna
1992 - Platinum Paws
1991 - Wilderness Song
1990 - One More Breeze
1989 - Charming Sassafras
1988 - Arcroyal
1987 - Playlist
1986 - Regency Silk
1985 - Conform
1984 - Sintrillium
1983 - Noble Town
1982 - Eternal Search
1981 - Solar Command
1980 - Feu d'Artifice
1979 - Glorious Song
1978 - La Malchance
1977 - Reasonable win
1976 - Bed Shy
1975 - Lost Majorette
1974 - Lost Majorette
1973 - Connie Pat
1972 - Connie Pat
1971 - Painted Pony
1970 - Not Too Shy
1969 - Miss Suzaki
1968 - Ice Water
1967 - Ice Water
1966 - Ice Water
1965 - Speedy Lament
1964 - Menedict
1963 - Stormy Morn
1962 - Court Royal
1961 - Mystery Guest
1960 - Royal Border
1959 - Wonder Where
1958 - Queen of Wind
1957 - La Belle Rose
1956 - Butter Ball

References
 The Belle Mahone Stakes at Woodbine Entertainment
 The Belle Mahone Stakes at Pedigree Query

Ungraded stakes races in Canada
Mile category horse races for fillies and mares
Recurring sporting events established in 1956
Woodbine Racetrack